The Dean of Manchester is based in Manchester, England and is the head of the Chapter of Manchester Cathedral. The current dean is Rogers Govender MBE.

List of deans

1840–1847 William Herbert
1847–1872 George Bowers
1872–1883 Benjamin Cowie (afterwards Dean of Exeter, 1883)
1884–1890 John Oakley
1890–1906 Edward Maclure
1906–1918 James Welldon
1918–1920 William Swayne (afterwards Bishop of Lincoln, 1920)
1920–1924 Gough McCormick
1924–1931 Hewlett Johnson (afterwards Dean of Canterbury, 1931)
1931–1948 Garfield Williams
1949–1953 Leonard Wilson (afterwards Bishop of Birmingham, 1953)
1954–1963 Herbert Jones
1964–1983 Alfred Jowett
1984–1993 Robert Waddington
1993–2005 Ken Riley
2005–present Rogers Govender

Christianity in Manchester

Dean of Manchester